Ben Foster (born 1977) is a BAFTA award-winning British composer, best known for his work on the BBC series Torchwood and as orchestrator for Murray Gold on Doctor Who and for Marc Streitenfeld on Prometheus and The Grey. He is also known for his work as the conductor for Peter Gabriel's Scratch my Back world tour and albums, and for the BBC Proms Doctor Who events.

Career 
Foster studied Composition and Conducting at the Guildhall School of Music and Drama, graduating in 2000. He was awarded the Lutosławski composition prize. He is a graduate of the National Film and Television School, where he studied with Francis Shaw and Peter Howell (the latter having composed for the BBC series Doctor Who, with which Foster would later become associated).

Doctor Who and Torchwood
Since November 2005, Foster has worked as orchestrator and conductor for composer Murray Gold on Doctor Who. 
He also conducted the BBC National Orchestra of Wales in Doctor Who: A Celebration, which was held at the Wales Millennium Centre on 19 November 2006 in aid of Children in Need. The concert was followed by the release of the first Doctor Who Soundtrack CD which includes music from series 1 and 2 of the programme. This was released on 11 December 2006 on Silva Screen Records.

On 5 November 2007, Silva Screen Records released The Soundtrack from Series 3. On 17 November 2008, The Soundtrack from Series 4, followed 10 days later by the broadcast of the first Doctor Who Prom. Foster arranged the music and conducted the BBC Philharmonic at this event, which was part of The Proms. On 24 and 25 July 2010, Foster again arranged and conducted Murray Gold's scores from Seasons 4+5 in the Doctor Who Proms, an event followed by the release of The Doctor Who 2008–2010 specials soundtrack on 4 October, and the Series 5 soundtrack on 8 November.
March 2011 saw the release of the soundtrack for the 2010 Christmas special, A Christmas Carol, and on 19 December of that year, the soundtrack for Series 6 was released.
Foster arranged and conducted Gold's music from Series 6 and 7, as well as some music from the classic (1963–89) years by Tristram Cary, Martin Slavin, Malcolm Clarke, Dudley Simpson, Paddy Kingsland, Peter Howell and Mark Ayres, for the third Doctor Who prom, performed at the Royal Albert Hall in August 2013, which was followed by the soundtrack releases for the seventh series and the 2011 and 2012 Christmas specials, on 9 September and 21 October respectively.

He also acted as Musical Director and Arranger for Doctor Who Live – which toured the UK in October – November 2010, conducting his 16-piece band.

Foster also composed music for the first three series of the BBC drama (and Doctor Who spin-off) Torchwood.

His work on the show has earned him three nominations in the Best Music category at the 2006, 2007 and 2009 BAFTA Cymru Awards. Silva Screen Records released a soundtrack album composed of his work on the first and second series in September 2008 and in July 2009 released the Children of Earth soundtrack.
Foster conducted the Melbourne Symphony Orchestra in Doctor Who – A Symphonic Spectacular which took place on 4 February 2012, and 31 January 2014, at the Melbourne Convention and Exhibition Centre in Australia. In December 2012 he conducted Sydney-based Metropolitan Orchestra in the  Doctor Who Symphonic Spectacular at the Sydney Opera House.

Foster left his role as Doctor Who conductor and orchestrator in 2015 and was replaced by Alastair King, who has recently taken up the full role for Series 10.

Other works
As a composer, Foster's early professional work includes theme tunes to Love on a Saturday Night, The 1970's Office and The Great British Test Series all for LWT as well as a host of commercials, working for the Mcasso Music agency. Other commercials he has worked on include award winning commercials for Soundtree Music such as Sony Paint and the 2007 Sony Walkman.

Foster's resume as an orchestrator and conductor for film includes 27 Dresses, The Mummy 3, The Hitchhiker's Guide to the Galaxy, Robin Hood, Hoodwinked Too, The Grey.

In 2005 Foster re-arranged the theme tune to BBC Question Time which is currently running on BBC2.

Foster was a judge on the Blue Peter Music Makers project in 2006, a contributor to the Blue Peter Movie Makers project in 2007 and chair of the judging panel for BBC Young Musician of the Year 2008. He also contributed to the CBBC project Clash.

Ben's early work as an arranger and conductor included work for Hayley Westenra, Aled Jones, Gary Barlow, S Club 7, Boyzone, Toploader and others.

Ben has worked extensively with the singer and composer Peter Gabriel since 2009, conducting his last two studio albums with the New Blood Orchestra and touring the 'New Blood' project across the world.

He works regularly with the London Session Orchestra and the BBC National Orchestra of Wales and has also worked with the BBC Philharmonic, RPO, BBC Concert Orchestra and the Czech Film Orchestra.

Recent work includes the themes and music for BBC Cardiff Singer of the World (2011) and BBC Young Musician (2012). He also co-wrote the music (with Murray Gold) for Scott & Bailey for ITV1.

He composed the score and arranged songs for a biopic of Dame Shirley Bassey for BBC2 which aired in September 2011.

Foster has been credited within BBC One's 2014 drama Happy Valley closing titles as the 'Composer'.

In 2015, Foster and his brother Nick worked on the soundtrack for CITV's Thunderbirds Are Go.

In 2016, Foster and the BBC Scottish Symphony Orchestra had composed a revamped version of the opening theme for the BBC Scotland series "Still Game".

Filmography

Television

Film

See also
 BBC National Orchestra of Wales
 Doctor Who
 Murray Gold

Footnotes

External links
  at Manners McDade
 
 
 
 

1977 births
Living people
British male conductors (music)
Alumni of the Guildhall School of Music and Drama
21st-century British conductors (music)
21st-century British male musicians